The 2002 Stratford-on-Avon District Council election took place on 2 May 2002 to elect members of Stratford-on-Avon District Council in Warwickshire, England. The whole council was up for election with boundary changes since the last election in 2000 reducing the number of seats by 2. The Conservative Party stayed in overall control of the council.

Campaign
All of the seats on the council were contested after boundary changes had reduced the number of seats from 55 to 53. Before the election the Conservatives ran the council with an overall majority of 1 seat.

The Liberal Democrats were the main opposition on the council and contested 46 of the 53 seats. They attacked the Conservatives for increasing council tax since taking control in 2000, while cutting grants to various groups and moving the council offices to a rented site. The Conservatives however defended their record saying that the move in council offices would save money and that they had introduced a new bus pass allowing cheaper travel. Other issues raised in the election included social housing, the environment, speeding traffic and recycling.

The results were counted electronically as part of a pilot scheme, while voters were able to use electronic voting in 140 electronic polling booths. This was expected to lead to results being declared much earlier than in many areas, with some expected within minutes of polls closing. However while turnout was quite high at around 40%, the results were delayed after the computers did not perform as well as expected.

Election result
The results saw the Conservatives retain an overall majority of just 1 seat on the council. They made gains in Ettington, Snitterfield and the new ward of Stockton and Napton, but lost seats in Studley and Harbury. The Liberal Democrats made gains primarily at the expense of independents, who lost the most seats in the election. Meanwhile, Labour retained their 2 seats in Southam, but failed to make any gains.

Ward results

References

2002 English local elections
2002
2000s in Warwickshire